Te Amo may refer to:
Te Amo (album), a 2008 album by Makano
Te Amo, an album by María Conchita Alonso
"Te Amo" (Makano song), 2008
"Te Amo" (Piso 21 and Paulo Londra song), 2018
"Te Amo" (Rihanna song), 2009
"Te Amo", a song by Alexander Acha
"Te Amo", a song by Ash King from the movie Dum Maaro Dum
"Te Amo", a song by Atlas Sound, from the album Parallax
"Te Amo", a song by Franco De Vita from Al Norte del Sur
"Te Amo", a song by Neyma
"Te Amo", a song by Rocío Dúrcal from Si Te Pudiera Mentir
"Te Amo", a song by the band Stryper
"Te Amo", the Spanish-language version of "Ti amo" by Umberto Tozzi
Te amo, a 1986 Argentine film featuring Ricardo Darín
Te Amo, a 2004 Philippine telenovela
Te Amo Amaru-Tibble (born 1989), New Zealand netball player
Te Amo, a brand of cigars produced in the Veracruz municipality of San Andrés Tuxtla

See also
Ti Amo (disambiguation)
I Love You (disambiguation)